Bidaik is a land border crossing point between Kazakhstan and Russia on the Kazakhstan side. It is located near the village of Bidaik, Ualikhanov District, North Kazakhstan Region. The checkpoint/crossing is situated on autoroute. Code checkpoint — 35091400

The Russian side is in Odesskoye in Odessky District in Omsk Oblast. There is a border crossing station on the Russian side also, and both have to be passed to enter the opposite country.

Description
Named after village of Bidaik that is located nearby. Across the border on the Russian side is a border checkpoint Odesskoye.

The type of crossing is automobile only, status — international and local. The types of transportation for automobile crossings are passenger and freight.

Distances from Bidaik
 Kokshetau: 267 km
 Omsk: 114 km

See also
 Kazakhstan–Russia border
 A13 highway (Kazakhstan)

References

Kazakhstan–Russia border crossings
North Kazakhstan Region